Uroš Košutić (born 11 November 1991) is a Serbian football midfielder.

References

External links
 
 Uroš Košutić stats at utakmica.rs 
 

1991 births
Living people
Footballers from Belgrade
Association football midfielders
Serbian footballers
FK Donji Srem players
FK Zemun players
Serbian SuperLiga players